Chasin' the Sun is the third studio album by American country music singer and songwriter Lionel Cartwright. It was released on August 31, 1991 via MCA Records. It contains his only number one single, "Leap of Faith." Two other singles released from the album, "What Kind of Fool" and "Family Tree," charted at numbers 24 and 62 respectively.

Track listing
All songs written by Lionel Cartwright except where noted.

Release history

Chart performance

Personnel
As listed in liner notes.

 Eddie Bayers – drums (2, 5, 6, 8, 10)
 Mike Brignardello – bass guitar (1, 3, 4, 9)
 Bob Britt – electric guitar (7)
 Lionel Cartwright – acoustic guitar (6, 7, 8), piano (4, 8, 9), mandolin (5)
 Jerry Douglas – Dobro (6 & 8)
 Glen Duncan – fiddle (6)
 Buddy Emmons – steel guitar (1 & 3)
 Paul Franklin – steel guitar (2 & 10)
 Dale Jarvis – bass guitar (7)
 John Jorgenson – acoustic guitar (1, 3, 4, 9), electric guitar (3 & 4), mandolin (1 & 4)
 Paul Kramer – fiddle (7)
 Mike Lawler – keyboards (2 & 10)
 Chris Leuzinger – electric guitar (6 & 8)
 Mac McAnally – acoustic guitar (9)
 George Marinelli – electric guitar (2 & 10)
 Weldon Myrick – steel guitar (4 & 9)
 Don Potter – acoustic guitar (2 & 10)
 Michael Rhodes – bass guitar (2 & 10)
 Matt Rollings – acoustic piano (2 & 10)
 Harry Stinson – drums (1, 3, 4, 9)
 Alex Torrez – drums (7)
 Greg Trostle – steel guitar (5 & 7)
 Biff Watson – acoustic guitar (5, 6, 8)
 John Willis – acoustic guitar (1, 3, 4), electric & gut string guitar (9)
 Glenn Worf – bass guitar (5, 6, 8)

Background and Harmony Vocalists
 The Beech (Nut) Boys – (1)
 Marty Brown – (5 & 7)
 Doug Clements – (7)
 Alison Krauss – (2)
 Mac McAnally – (1, 4, 9)
 George Marinelli – (1)
 Lewis Nunley – (7)
 Hershey Reeves – (10)
 Judy Rodman – (7)
 Ricky Skaggs – (1)
 Russell Smith – (3)
 Harry Stinson – (2, 3, 4, 9, 10)
 Jim Photoglo – (1)
 Karen Taylor-Good – (7)

Production
  Harry Stinson & Ed Seay (1, 3, 4 & 9)
  Andy Byrd & Lionel Cartwright (5 - 8)
  Barry Beckett & Tony Brown (2 & 10)

References

1991 albums
Lionel Cartwright albums
MCA Records albums
Tony Brown
Albums produced by Barry Beckett